Paul Lambert (born 1969) is a Scottish football manager and former player.

Paul Lambert may also refer to the following:
Paul Lambert (water polo) (1908–1996), French water polo player
Paul Lambert (actor) (1922–1997), American character actor
Paul Lambert (basketball) (1934–1978), American college basketball coach
Paul Lambert (cooperator) (1912–1977), Belgian co-operator and economist
Paul Lambert (equestrian) (1876–?), Belgian Olympic equestrian, 1900
Paul Lambert (journalist) (1958/59–2020), British media and television producer
Paul Lambert (Nebraska politician) (born 1950), Nebraska state senator
Paul Lambert (Royal Navy officer) (born 1954), Royal Navy admiral
Paul Lambert (TV personality) (born 1970), best known as "Engineer Ed" in the children's television show Fun Junction Depot
Paul Lambert (Canadian football) (born 1975), Canadian football offensive guard
Paul Lambert (Emmerdale), a fictional character in the British soap opera Emmerdale
Paul E. Lambert (born 1950), suffragan bishop of Dallas
Paul Lambert (special effects artist), visual effects supervisor at DNEG
Paul C. Lambert (born 1928), United States Ambassador to Ecuador
Lambert (pianist) (born 1983), masked neo-classical musician born Paul Lambert

See also
Lambert (name)